Carex adusta, commonly known as the lesser brown sedge or the browned sedge, is a species of sedge (Carex) in the section Ovales. First described scientifically in 1839 by Francis Boott, it is found in Canada and the northeastern United States, where it grows in dry, acidic, sandy soils.   is Latin for "burnt," probably referring to the color.

Description

References

adusta
Plants described in 1839
Flora of Western Canada
Flora of Eastern Canada
Flora of Wisconsin
Flora of Minnesota
Flora of Michigan
Flora of New York (state)
Flora of Maine
Flora without expected TNC conservation status